Kunzea graniticola  is a plant in the myrtle family, Myrtaceae and is endemic to Queensland. It is a shrub or small tree with linear to egg-shaped leaves and rounded groups of white or cream-coloured flowers on the ends of the branches in August and September. It is only known from forests near Cardwell and on Hinchinbrook Island.

Description
The leaves are arranged alternately along the branches and are linear to egg-shaped with the narrower end towards the base. The leaves are flat, glabrous and have up to sixty oil glands visible on the lower surface only. The flowers are white or cream-coloured and arranged in rounded groups of three to eight on the ends of all the branches. Flowering occurs in August and September.

Taxonomy and naming
Kunzea graniticola was first formally described in 1982 by Norman Brice Byrnes from a specimen found north of Ingham. The description was published in Austrobaileya.

Distribution and habitat
Growing on rocky slopes and on river banks in forest, K. graniticola occurs on Hinchinbrook Island and nearby mainland areas near Cardwell.

Conservation
Kunzea graniticola is classified as "Least Concern" under the Queensland Nature Conservation Act 1992.

References

graniticola
Flora of Queensland
Plants described in 1982
Myrtales of Australia
Endemic flora of Australia
Taxa named by Norman Brice Byrnes